Jimena Pérez Blanco (born 22 August 1997) is a Spanish swimmer. She competed in the women's 1500 metre freestyle event at the 2017 World Aquatics Championships. In 2019, she represented Spain at the 2019 World Aquatics Championships held in Gwangju, South Korea. She competed in the women's 800 metre freestyle and women's 1500 metre freestyle events. In both events she did not advance to compete in the final. She also competed in the women's 400 metre individual medley event.

References

External links
 

1997 births
Living people
Spanish female medley swimmers
Swimmers at the 2018 Mediterranean Games
Spanish female freestyle swimmers
Mediterranean Games competitors for Spain
Swimmers at the 2014 Summer Youth Olympics
Swimmers at the 2020 Summer Olympics
Olympic swimmers of Spain
21st-century Spanish women